The Elizabeth Glaser Pediatric AIDS Foundation (EGPAF) is a nonprofit organization dedicated to preventing pediatric HIV  infection and eliminating pediatric AIDS through research, advocacy, and prevention and treatment programs. Founded in 1988, the organization works in 12 countries around the world.

History

Background
Elizabeth Glaser (née Elizabeth Meyer) (November 11, 1947 – December 3, 1994) was an American AIDS activist and child advocate. She was married to actor and director Paul Michael Glaser. Glaser contracted HIV in 1981 during the early stages of the AIDS epidemic after receiving a transfusion of contaminated blood while giving birth to her daughter Ariel. Glaser unknowingly passed the virus to Ariel and to her son Jake, who was born three years later.

The virus went undetected in all three family members until they underwent HIV testing in 1985, at which time Ariel began suffering from a series of unexplained illnesses. Ariel had developed advanced AIDS at a time when the medical community knew very little about the disease, and there were no available treatment options particularly for children. The U.S. Food and Drug Administration approved AZT in 1987 as a drug that could extend the lives of AIDS patients, but this approval only extended to adults. Although the Glasers fought to have their daughter treated with AZT intravenously, Ariel died from complications of AIDS in 1988.

In the aftermath of Ariel's death, and determined to save her son Jake, as well as to give hope to other HIV-positive children, Glaser co-founded the Pediatric AIDS Foundation in 1988 with friends Susan DeLaurentis and Susie Zeegen. Their work raised public awareness about HIV infection in children, and spurred funding for the development of pediatric AIDS drugs as well as research into mother-to-child transmission of HIV. In 1991, Glaser published an autobiography about her family's ordeal. The book was entitled In the Absence of Angels, and it was co-written with author Laura Palmer.

An advocate for the elimination of pediatric AIDS, Glaser became known to audiences nationwide when she was a featured speaker at the 1992 Democratic National Convention. During her speech, she criticized the federal government's underfunding of AIDS research and its lack of initiative in addressing the AIDS crisis. Elizabeth and her family also were profiled in a 1991 edition of People.

Glaser died in 1994, and the Pediatric AIDS Foundation was renamed the Elizabeth Glaser Pediatric AIDS Foundation in her honor shortly thereafter.

1994 - present
As of December 31, 2009, the Foundation reached the following milestones in its prevention, care, and treatment initiatives:
 The Foundation worked in 17 countries and supported more than 4,800 sites.
 In 2009, more than 2.3 million women accessed Foundation-supported services for prevention of mother-to-child transmission of HIV. Since the beginning of its global programs, the Foundation has provided more than 9.2 million women with the services to prevent transmission of HIV to their babies.
 In six years, the Foundation's care and treatment programs, focused on children and their families, have enrolled more than 923,000 individuals, including nearly 75,000 children. Since enrollment began, more than 482,000 individuals have begun antiretroviral treatment—and more than 39,000 are children under the age of 15.

Activities

EGPAF works to eliminate pediatric AIDS in three ways:
 International Programs: Responding to the need for HIV prevention, care, and treatment services, the Foundation works in regions of the world most affected by HIV and AIDS. Working together with governments and partners, Foundation-supported programs provide a range of HIV-related services: counseling, testing, the establishment of prevention of mother-to-child transmission (PMTCT) programs, and lifelong care and treatment for children and families.
 Research:  Foundation-funded researchers around the world work to improve HIV prevention, care, and treatment programs; to train the next generation of international pediatric HIV research leaders; and to pursue the development of a pediatric HIV vaccine.
 Public Policy and Global Advocacy:  The Foundation’s public policy and global advocacy efforts work to challenge national governments and international organizations to commit the political and financial resources necessary to achieve the elimination of pediatric AIDS.

Grants and awards
The Elizabeth Glaser Pediatric AIDS Foundation provides several grants and awards to scientists performing research aimed towards the study and eradication of pediatric AIDS. The Elizabeth Glaser Scientist Award is one of the many awards that the foundation offers through a competitive award application process.

Award and grant winners
 Margaret Feeney, M.D., M.Sc. 2006 Elizabeth Glaser Scientist Award Winner for her project, "The Immune Response to Acute Perinatal HIV Infection".
 Alexandra Trkola, Ph.D. 2006 Elizabeth Glaser Scientist Award Winner for her project, "The Humoral Immune Response to HIV".
 Jeffrey S. A. Stringer, M.D. 2002 Elizabeth Glaser Scientist Award Winner for his project, "Optimal Use of Nevirapine to Prevent Perinatal HIV".
 Sunil Kumar Ahuja, M.D. 2001 Elizabeth Glaser Scientist Award Winner for work on the influence of genetics on HIV/AIDS.

Goals
The Foundation’s overarching goals include:
 Increasing access to services for prevention of mother-to-child transmission (PMTCT) of HIV;
 Increasing access to care and treatment for children and families, including antiretroviral therapy (ART);
 Linking PMTCT services to care and treatment in order to provide a continuum of care;
 Researching and identifying technologies and interventions in PMTCT and care and treatment;
 Documenting replicable models in PMTCT and care and treatment; and
 Training research and program leaders to advance all of the above.

References

External links
 Elizabeth Glaser Pediatric AIDS Foundation website
 Elizabeth Glaser Pediatric AIDS Foundation listing at Foundation Center
 Text and audio of Elizabeth Glaser’s speech at the 1992 Democratic National Convention
 A 1994 remembrance of Elizabeth Glaser (video) from The Charlie Rose Show

Medical and health foundations in the United States
HIV/AIDS organizations in the United States
Organizations established in 1988
Medical and health organizations based in Washington, D.C.